Natalie Porat-Shliom is an Israeli-American cell biologist and microscopist specialized in intravital microscopy to research mitochondrial structure. She is a NIH Stadtman Investigator and head of the cell biology and imaging section at the National Cancer Institute.

Education 
Porat-Shliom completed a B.Sc. in biology, M.Sc. in neurobiology and Ph.D. in cell biology from Tel Aviv University (TAU).

Career and research 
In 2018, Porat-Shliom became a tenure-track NIH Stadtman Investigator in the NCI Thoracic and GI Malignancies Branch where she heads the cell biology and imaging section. Porat-Shliom is a cell biologist with expertise in light microscopy techniques, particularly, intravital microscopy. Her lab uses a combination of molecular, biochemical and imaging approaches to investigate the principles underlying mitochondrial structure and function and the changes under pathological conditions such as cellular transformation.

References

External links 
 
 

Living people
Year of birth missing (living people)
Place of birth missing (living people)
Israeli women scientists
Israeli biologists
21st-century American women scientists
Cell biologists
Cancer researchers
American medical researchers
Israeli medical researchers
Women medical researchers
Microscopists
American women biologists
21st-century American biologists
Tel Aviv University alumni
National Institutes of Health people